Kronprinsessegade 16 is a Neoclassical property overlooking Rosenborg Castle Garden in central Copenhagen, Denmark.

History
Kronprinsessegade 16 was built in 1807 as one of five properties at Kronprinsessegade Np. 10-18 that were built by master builder Johan Martin Quist. The poet Jens Baggesen was a resident in the building in the mid-1810s. The writer and educator Athalia Schwartz (1821-1871) lived in the building from 1851 to 853.

Architecture
The building consists of four storeys over a high cellar and is five bays wide. Two triangular pediments are located over the outer windows on the second floor. The Mansard roof  with three dormers dates from 1902 to 1908. A five-storey side wing projects from the rear side of the building. The complex was listed on the Danish registry of protected buildings and places on 14 April 1945.

Today

References

External links

Listed residential buildings in Copenhagen
Residential buildings completed in 1807
1807 establishments in Denmark
Johan Martin Quist buildings